Partille Arena is a multi-purpose indoor arena that was inaugurated in September 2016. The arena holds 5,500 people during concerts and 4,000 during sporting events. The arena also holds a gym, bowling alley, restaurant and conference rooms.

Events and tenants
Since the arena's inauguration, it has hosted a number of events, such as P3 Guld, Sweden's biggest music awards. In 2018, a new audience record was set when Bryan Adams played in front of 5,503 people.

The event management is operated by the municipality of Partille and the arena holds a number of tenants, one of which is IK Sävehof, a handball club from Partille. IK Sävehof is one of the biggest handball clubs in the world and has both a women's and men's team in the highest respective leagues in Sweden.

See also
List of indoor arenas in Sweden

References

External links
 

Indoor arenas in Sweden
Handball venues in Sweden
Music venues in Sweden
Buildings and structures in Västra Götaland County
Sports venues completed in 2016
2016 establishments in Sweden